The NKL-26  was an armoured aerosan introduced by the Soviet Union during the Second World War, based on the earlier NKL-6 (OSGA-6).  It was made of plywood and had a ten-millimetre armour plate on the front only, and was armed with a 7.62mm DT machine gun in a ring mount.  It was powered by an M-11G aircraft engine.

Each NKL-26 was operated by two crewmen. NKL-26s were organized into battalions of 30 NKL-16s with a transport company of NKL-16s - each with three companies of 10.  Each company was organized as three platoons of three vehicles, and a commanders vehicle.

Combat Aerosans often worked with ski infantry battalions, and could carry four ski troops riding outside the vehicle on its skis or towed behind.

References

External links 
 NKL-26 Snowmobile  at the Russian Battlefield
 Aerosan NKL-26 on engines of the red army in ww2
Aerosan, motorized sled NKL-26 

World War II armoured fighting vehicles of the Soviet Union
Snowmobiles